Kalmiuskyi District, formerly known as Illichivskyi District, is an urban district of the city of Mariupol, Ukraine.

In 2016, it was renamed to its current name to comply with decommunization laws.

Demographics
According to the 2001 census, the district's population was 102,946, of whom 6.03% spoke Ukrainian, 93.60% Russian, 0.07% Armenian, 0.06% Greek, 0.04% Belarusian, 0.03% - Romani, 0.01% - Moldovan (Romanian), Jewish, Bulgarian, German and Romanian (self-declared).

References

Urban districts of Mariupol